Nikolay Krastev may refer to:

 Nikolay Krastev (footballer, born 1979), Bulgarian football defender
 Nikolay Krastev (footballer, born 1996), Bulgarian football goalkeeper